{{Infobox College baseball team
|current = 2023 Incarnate Word Cardinals baseball team
|name = Incarnate Word Cardinals
|founded = 1987
|logo = Incarnate Word UIW logo.png
|logo_size = 250
|university = University of the Incarnate Word
|athletic_director = Richard Duran (Interim)
|conference = Southland
|division = 
|location = San Antonio, Texas
|coach = Ryan Shotzberger
|tenure = 4th
|stadium = Sullivan Field
|capacity = 1,000
|nickname = Cardinals
| record = 991–767–2
|national_champion = 
|cws = 
|ncaa_tourneys = 
|conference_tournament = Heart of Texas1997

Heartland2001, 2010
|conference_champion = Heart of Texas1990, 1993, 1997Heartland2005, 2006

Lone Star2011
}}

 For information on all University of the Incarnate Word sports, see Incarnate Word Cardinals

The Incarnate Word Cardinals baseball team''' represents The University of the Incarnate Word in NCAA Division I intercollegiate men's baseball competition. The Cardinals currently compete in the Southland Conference. The Cardinals play home games at Sullivan Field. The team is led by first-year head coach Ryan Shotzberger.

History
Incarnate Word baseball has compiled an all-time record of 925–719–2 (.564 winning percentage) through the 2017 season. The Cardinals have won 6 regular season conference championships and 3 conference tournament championships. Incarnate Word has made 5 NCAA Postseason Regional Tournaments (1 NAIA Regional Tournament and 4 NCAA Division II South Central Regional Tournaments).

All-time season results

Major League Baseball
Incarnate Word has had 8 Major League Baseball Draft selections since the draft began in 1965.

See also
List of NCAA Division I baseball programs

References

External links